Nico Slain is an international rugby league footballer who represented Papua New Guinea at the 2008 Rugby League World Cup.

He made one appearance for the Kumuls in their 2008 World Cup campaign in a 46–6 defeat by Australia at the Dairy Farmers Stadium.

References

Living people
Expatriate rugby league players in England
Goroka Lahanis players
Hunslet R.L.F.C. players
Papua New Guinea national rugby league team players
Papua New Guinean expatriate rugby league players
Papua New Guinean expatriate sportspeople in England
Papua New Guinean rugby league players
Rugby league props
Year of birth missing (living people)